Steinunn Finnsdóttir (c. 1640 – c. 1710) was the first known Icelandic female writer to leave a substantial body of poetry. Her major works are two rímur cycles: Hyndlu rímur and Snækóngs rímur. She also composed vikivaki carols, occasional verses and a poem on mediaeval Icelandic heroes. The material in both of Steinunn's rímur cycles is drawn from earlier fairy tale ballads and in each case the main character is a woman who has been placed under a spell, one turned into a dog and the other into a man.

Early commentators considered Steinunn an unoriginal minor figure in the history of Icelandic literature but recent critics have praised her for the originality of her mansöngvar and her "vision of a more just social system" (Bergljót Kristjánsdóttir 1996:340).

References
Bergljót Kristjánsdóttir (1996). „Gunnlöð ekki gaf mér neitt / af geimsludrykknum forðum ...“ in Guðamjöður og Arnarleir, edited by Sverrir Tómasson, pp. 165–219 and 339-40 (English summary). Reykjavík: Háskólaútgáfan. 
Hughes, Shaun F.D. (2000). "The Re-emergence of Women's Voices in Icelandic Literature, 1500–1800." in Cold Counsel, edited by Sarah M. Anderson and Karen Swenson, pp. 93–128. Routledge. 
Steinunn Finnsdóttir (edited by Bjarni Vilhjálmsson) (1950). Rit Rímnafélagsins III: Hyndlu rímur og Snækóngs rímur. Reykjavík: Rímnafélagið.

1640s births
1710s deaths
17th-century Icelandic poets
Icelandic women poets
18th-century Icelandic poets
Icelandic women writers
18th-century Icelandic women
17th-century Icelandic women